Ten Rapid (Collected Recordings 1996–1997) is a compilation album by Scottish post-rock group Mogwai, released in various countries in 1997.

Background
Ten Rapid brings together various songs recorded by Mogwai and released between 1996 and 1997. "Tuner" is a rerecorded version of the band's March 1996 debut double A-sided single (from which "Lower" does not appear), released on Rock Action. "Angels versus Aliens" is a rerecorded version of the July 1996 split single with Dweeb, released on Ché Trading. 

"A Place for Parks" was given away free to attendees of the Camden Crawl II show in Camden Town on 19 September 1996, on a compilation CD entitled The Camden Crawl II, released on Love Train. "I Am Not Batman" was given away free to attendees of the Ten Day Weekend Festival in Glasgow in October 1996, on a compilation cassette entitled Hoover Your Head: Ten Day Weekend, released on Sano Music. "Summer" and "Ithica 27ϕ9" were released as a double A-sided single in November 1996 on Love Train. "Helicon 1" and "Helicon 2" were released as a double A-sided single in February 1997 on Wurlitzer Jukebox. "End" is "Helicon 2", played backwards. The cover art of Ten Rapid was designed by Victoria Braithwaite. The CD artwork depicts portions of the McMinnville UFO photographs.

Track listing
All songs were written by Mogwai.
"Summer" – 4:25
"Helicon 2" – 2:51 
"Angels versus Aliens" – 5:37
"I Am Not Batman" – 3:32
"Tuner" – 2:57
"Ithica 27 ϕ 9" – 2:57
"A Place for Parks" – 2:14
"Helicon 1" – 6:00
"End" – 2:44

Personnel
 Stuart Braithwaite – guitar, keyboard, vocals, percussion
 Dominic Aitchison – bass guitar, guitar
 Martin Bulloch – drums
 John Cummings – guitar
 Paul Savage – producer on tracks 1, 3–7
 Andy Miller – producer tracks 2, 8–9

Release history
Ten Rapid was originally released in various countries in 1997.

External links

Mogwai compilation albums
1997 compilation albums
1997 debut albums
Rock Action Records albums
Jetset Records albums